Alquízar Municipal Museum is a museum located in the 91st avenue in Alquízar, Cuba. It was established as museum on 28 January 1981.

The museum holds sections on history, weaponry and decorative arts.

See also 
 List of museums in Cuba

References 

Museums in Cuba
Buildings and structures in Artemisa Province
Museums established in 1981
1981 establishments in Cuba
20th-century architecture in Cuba